Nathan Gamble (born January 12, 1998) is an American actor who made his feature film debut in Babel (2006), for which he was nominated for a 2007 Young Artist Award. He is best known for his role as Sawyer Nelson in Dolphin Tale and the sequel Dolphin Tale 2.

Life and career
Gamble was born in Tacoma, Washington, the son of theater directors who run a drama camp for children. His additional screen credits include Dry Rain (2007), Saving Sam (2007), Diggers (2007), The Mist (2007), The Dark Knight (2008), Marley & Me (2008), The Hole (2009),  Dolphin Tale (2011) and Dolphin Tale 2 (2014).

On television, Gamble appeared in Runaway in 2006; crossover episodes of CSI: Crime Scene Investigation and Without a Trace in 2007; and House M.D. and Ghost Whisperer in 2008. In 2009, he played the role of Henry Pryor, son of the titular character in Hank. In 2010, he played the role of Daniel in a short film called Displaced; the film was commissioned by the city of Seattle as part of the Water Calling series and aired at Seattle Channel.

Gamble has completed filming the role of Poe Malloy in Captain Cook's Extraordinary Atlas for Warner Bros. Television. He portrayed Lucas Thompson in the film The Hole, which was released in 2009.

His first lead role was in the 2011 film Dolphin Tale, where he plays Sawyer Nelson, a young boy who discovers a dolphin caught in a crab trap in Florida (based on the real-life story of Winter the dolphin). He reprised his role as Sawyer Nelson in the 2014 sequel, Dolphin Tale 2.

Filmography
{| class="wikitable sortable"
|+ Film
|-
! Year
! Title
! Role
! Notes
|-
| 2006
| Babel
| Mike Jones 
|
|-
| 2007
| Deeply Irresponsible
| 
|
|-
| 2007 
| Diggers
| Boy
| Short 
|-
| 2007
| The Mist
| Billy Drayton 
|
|-
| 2008
| Dry Rain
| Joey 
| Short
|-
| 2008
| The Dark Knight
| James Gordon Jr. 
|
|-
| 2008
| Marley & Me
| Patrick Grogan (Age 10) 
|
|-
| 2009
| Captain Cook's Extraordinary Atlas
| Poe Malloy
| TV Movie 
|-
| 2009
| The Hole
| Lucas Thompson 
|
|-
| 2010
| Displaced
| Daniel
| Short
|-
| 2011
| Fetch
| Linney
| Short
|-
| 2011
| 25 Hill
| Trey Caldwell 
|
|-
| 2011
| Dolphin Tale
| Sawyer Nelson
| 
|-
| 2012
| The Frontier 
| Samuel Hale 
| TV movie
|-
| 2012
| All My Presidents
| Franklin - Age 13  
| Short
|-
| 2012
| Dear Dracula
| Sam (voice) 
| Video
|-
| 2013
| Beyond the Heavens
| Oliver Henry 
| 
|-
| 2014
| Dolphin Tale 2
| Sawyer Nelson
|
|-
| 2018
| Swiped
| Daniel
|
|-
|}

Awards and nominations

References

External links

Nathan Gamble on Facebook
Nathan Gamble on Twitter

1998 births
American male child actors
American male film actors
American male television actors
Living people
Male actors from Tacoma, Washington
21st-century American male actors